Arūnas Visockas (born 7 December 1965) is a retired Lithuanian basketball player for the Lithuanian national basketball team and Žalgiris Kaunas. He was a power forward 200 cm tall and weighed 108 kg. Visockas is currently the assistant coach of the Lithuanian basketball team BC Kaunas Triobet. His former clubs include BC Zalgiris (1985–1996), Atomeromu Paks (1996–2000) and Statyba Jonava (2000–2001).

Awards and achievements
 Olympic Bronze medalist – 1992
 European championship Silver medalist – 1995

References
 
 Articles. FIBA.

1965 births
Living people
Lithuanian men's basketball players
BC Žalgiris players
Olympic basketball players of Lithuania
Basketball players at the 1992 Summer Olympics
Olympic bronze medalists for Lithuania
Olympic medalists in basketball
Medalists at the 1992 Summer Olympics
Power forwards (basketball)
Basketball players from Kaunas